Rostovka is a rural locality (a settlement) and the administrative center of Omsky District, Omsk Oblast, Russia. Population:

References

Notes

Sources

Rural localities in Omsk Oblast